Carlo Cassola (17 March 1917 – 29 January 1987) was an influential Italian novelist and essayist. His novel La Ragazza di Bube (1960), which received the Strega Prize, was adapted into a film of the same name by Luigi Comencini in 1963.

Bibliography 

From the collection of the Library of Congress, Washington, DC:

L'amore tanto per fare (1981)
Gli anni passano (1982)
L'antagonista (1976)
An arid heart Translated by William Weaver. (1964)
Bebo's girl Translated by Marguerite Waldman. (1962)
Carlo Cassola: letteratura e disarmo: intervista e testi (1978)
Il cacciatore (1964)
La casa di via Valadier (1968)
Cassola racconta (1981)
Colloquio con le ombre (1982)
Contro le armi (1980)
Conversazione su una cultura compromessa (1977)
Un cuore arido (1961)
La disavventura (1977)
Fausto and Anna Translated by Isabel Quigly. (1960) 
Ferragosto di morte: romanzo (1980)
Ferrovia locale (1968)
Fogli di diario (1974)
Il gigante cieco (1976)
Gisella (1974)
Gisella Second edition. (1978)
Le lezione della storia (1978)
Mio padre (1983)
Il mondo senza nessuno: romanzo (1982)
Monte Mario (1973) (Portrait of Helena, 1975  )
La morale del branco (1980)
Il paradiso degli animali (1979)
Paura e tristezza (1970) (1984 edition  )
La ragazza di Bube (1960) 14th edition (1995) 
Il ribelle (1980)
La rivoluzione disarmista (1983)
Il romanzo moderno (1981)
Il soldato (1965)
Storia di Ada (1967)
Il superstite (1978)
Il taglio del bosco (1955)
Il taglio del bosco: racconti lunghi e romanzi brevi (1975)
Il taglio del bosco: Rosa Gagliardi; Le amiche (1995)
Il taglio del bosco, venticinque racconti (1955)
Tempi memorabili (1981)
Troppo tardi (1975)
Ultima frontiera (1976)
L’uomo e il cane (1975)
Un uomo solo (1978)
I vecchi compagni: un matrimonio del dopoguera (1978)
Vita d’artista (1980)
La zampa d’oca (1981)
Poesia e romanzo with Mario Luzi. (1973)
Carlo Cassola Selections by Rodolfo Macchioni Jodi. (1976, 1982)
La forza della parola : incontri con Cassola.... Interview by Franco Zangrilli. (1992)

References

1917 births
1987 deaths
Italian anti-fascists
Italian resistance movement members
Writers from Rome
Strega Prize winners
Bancarella Prize winners
20th-century Italian novelists
20th-century Italian male writers